The 2015 Grote Prijs Jef Scherens was the 49th edition of the Grote Prijs Jef Scherens cycle race and was held on 23 August 2015. The race started and finished in Leuven. The race was won by Björn Leukemans.

General classification

References

2015
2015 in road cycling
2015 in Belgian sport